Kent Spitfire may refer to:

 Spitfire (beer), a Kentish ale
 Kent County Cricket Club, also known as the Kent Spitfires

See also
 Spitfire (disambiguation)